Sunday Funday may refer to:

Sunday Funday (TV program), a Philippine variety show
Sunday Funday (block), a programming block on American TV network Fox
Sunday Funday, a 1995 video game based on Menace Beach